Sainte-Catherine-de-Hatley is a municipality in the Memphrémagog Regional County Municipality in the Eastern Townships region of Quebec, Canada.

Located along Quebec Route 108 on Little Lake Magog, it is the home of the "Marais" birdwatching sanctuary, the Eglise Sainte Catherine de Hatley, as well as the Dominique Savio primary School.

Geography 

Sainte-Catherine-de-Hatley is located 10 km south of Sherbrooke and 10 km east of Magog, between the southeast shore of lake Magog and the west shore of lake Massawippi.

Establishments 

Sainte-Catherine-de-Hatley includes a church, a cemetery, a community hall, two lakes (in part), Île du Marais, an inn-restaurant, a convenience store, a canteen, a butcher, a campsite, a horticulture center, a dog park, a theater, an antique dealer, a credit union, a primary school, a town hall as well as several tourist and recreational facilities.

The Sainte-Catherine-de-Hatley Auberge (restaurant) located opposite the church is known for its Sunday brunches and the dining room's view of Mont-Orford.

Le Manoir aux mystères is a restaurant located directly in the center of the village, diagonal from the church.

Toponymy 
The place was previously known as "Katevale".

"Originally, a mission was established in 1845 under the name of Sainte-Catherine-de-Hatley and was canonically erected in 1890. Subsequently, a municipality of the same name was created in 1901".

See also 
 Piggery Theatre
 Arthur Russell Virgin
 List of municipalities in Quebec

References

External links

Municipalities in Quebec
Incorporated places in Estrie